Wulukou Station can refer to:

 Wulukou Station (Chongqing), a metro station in Chongqing, China
 Wulukou Station (Xi'an), a metro station in Xi'an, China